Auer rods (or Auer bodies) are large, crystalline cytoplasmic inclusion bodies sometimes observed in myeloid blast cells during acute myeloid leukemia, acute promyelocytic leukemia, high-grade myelodysplastic syndromes and myeloproliferative disorders.  Composed of fused lysosomes and rich in lysosomal enzymes, Auer rods are azurophilic and can resemble needles, commas, diamonds, rectangles, corkscrews, or (rarely) granules.

Eponym
Although Auer rods are named for American physiologist John Auer, they were first described in 1905 by Canadian physician Thomas McCrae, then at Johns Hopkins Hospital, as Auer himself acknowledged in his 1906 paper. Both McCrae and Auer mistakenly thought that the cells containing the rods were lymphoblasts.

Additional images

References

External links
 Image at NIH/MedlinePlus
 Slides at wadsworth.org
 Image at University of Utah

Leukemia
Histopathology